The 1958 Georgia Bulldogs football team represented the Georgia Bulldogs of the University of Georgia during the 1958 NCAA University Division football season.

Schedule

Source: GeorgiaDogs.com: 1958 football schedule

Roster
Fran Tarkenton, So.

References

Georgia
Georgia Bulldogs football seasons
Georgia Bulldogs football